A. cracentis may refer to:

Acacia cracentis, a flowering plant species
Acyphoderes cracentis, a beetle species
Anoplonida cracentis, a squat lobster species